Iraq competed at the 2004 Summer Paralympics in Athens, Greece. The team included eight athletes, all of them men.

Medallists

Sports

Athletics

Men's field

Powerlifting

Wheelchair fencing

Men

See also
Iraq at the Paralympics
Iraq at the 2004 Summer Olympics

References 

Nations at the 2004 Summer Paralympics
2004
Summer Paralympics